Dunzo is an Indian company that delivers groceries and essentials, fruits and vegetables, meat, pet supplies, food, and medicines in major cities. It also has a separate service to pick up and deliver packages within the same city. Dunzo currently provides its delivery services in eight Indian cities including Bangalore, Delhi, Gurgaon, Pune, Chennai, Jaipur, Mumbai and Hyderabad. The company also operates a bike taxi service in Gurgaon. Dunzo is headquartered in Bangalore and was founded in 2014 by Kabeer Biswas along with co-founders Ankur Agarwal, Dalvir Suri and Mukund Jha.

History 

Dunzo was founded in July, 2014 by Kabeer Biswas, an alumnus of the K. J. Somaiya College of Engineering,University of Mumbai. Before Dunzo, Kabeer founded a company called Hoppr, which was acquired by Hike in 2014. Dunzo started out as a small WhatsApp group, and transformed into a hyperlocal, app-based service.

Dunzo raised its first round of funding of US$650k in March 2016 from Blume Ventures, Aspada Ventures, accompanied by other investors including, Rajan Anandan, MD of Google India and Sandipan Chattopaday.

In December 2017, Dunzo received US$12 million in a fresh round from Google, with existing investors, Blume Ventures and Aspada participating in the round. This was Google's first direct investment in a startup in India.

On 29 August 2019, Dunzo raised ₹34.56 crore funding by issuing debentures as well as Series C1 preference shares to existing investor Alteria Capital.

In 2021, following changes to Google Play's terms that banned the sale of tobacco and liquor, Dunzo launched a parallel app called Dunzo Mo which can be downloaded as an APK file on the website. Tobacco and paan items were also no longer available on Dunzo's main app for Android users although they were available on the iOS version and on the website.

In August 2021, Dunzo expanded into quick commerce by launching a new service, Dunzo Daily, to deliver essentials and household items in 19 minutes.

In January 2022, Reliance Retail led a US$240 million funding round along with Dunzo's existing investors Lightbox, Lightrock, 3L Capital and Alteria Capital. Reliance Retail invested US$200 million for a 25.8% stake in Dunzo.

Partnerships 
In May 2020, Dunzo partnered with FMCG major PepsiCo to deliver its snacks brands such as Lay’s and Kurkure to customers’ doorsteps in Bengaluru amid the lockdown due to the Covid-19 pandemic in India in keeping with Pepsico's ‘Direct-to-Customer’ initiative.

In the same month, it also partnered with digital payments app Google Pay to provide grocery and medicine delivery, bike pool, pickup-and-drop, among other services.

References 

Online companies of India
Transport companies of India
Indian companies established in 2014
Transport companies established in 2014
Internet properties established in 2014
Online food ordering
IOS software
Android (operating system) software